The 1989 Major League Baseball postseason was the playoff tournament of Major League Baseball for the 1989 season. The winners of each division advance to the postseason and face each other in a League Championship Series to determine the pennant winners that face each other in the World Series.
 
In the American League, the Oakland Athletics returned to the postseason for the second year in a row, and the Toronto Blue Jays returned for the second time in five years. The Blue Jays would return to the postseason in three of the next four seasons.
 
In the National League, the San Francisco Giants returned to the postseason for the second time in three years, and the Chicago Cubs returned for the second time in six years.

The playoffs began on October 3, 1989, and concluded on October 28, 1989, with the Athletics sweeping the Giants to win their first World Series title since 1974. The series became marred by the 1989 Loma Prieta earthquake which caused major damage to both Oakland and San Francisco, as well as Candlestick Park where Games 3 and 4 were played.

Playoff seeds
The following teams qualified for the postseason:

American League
 Toronto Blue Jays - 89–73, Clinched AL East
 Oakland Athletics - 99–63, Clinched AL West

National League
 Chicago Cubs - 93–69, Clinched NL East
 San Francisco Giants - 92–70, Clinched NL West

Playoff bracket

American League Championship Series

Oakland Athletics vs. Toronto Blue Jays

This was the first postseason meeting between the Athletics and Blue Jays. The Athletics won in five games to return to the World Series for the second consecutive year.

The Athletics overcame a 3-2 Blue Jays lead in the sixth inning, and ended up winning Game 1 by a 7-3 score. The Athletics won convincingly in Game 2 by three runs to take a 2-0 series lead headed to Toronto. In Game 3, the Blue Jays got on the board with a 7-3 victory, overcoming a 3-0 Oakland lead with seven unanswered runs in the fourth and seventh innings respectively. Dennis Eckersley helped stop a late comeback by the Blue Jays to preserve a one-run Athletics lead as they won 6-5 to take a 3-1 series lead. Eckersley again held off a late rally by the Blue Jays in Game 5 as the Athletics won 4-3 to secure the pennant.

The Blue Jays returned to the ALCS in 1991, but would fall to the Minnesota Twins in five games. The Athletics and Blue Jays would meet again in the 1992 ALCS, where the Blue Jays defeated the Athletics in six games en route to their first World Series title. The Athletics would win the pennant once more in 1990, where they swept the Boston Red Sox before falling in the World Series to the Cincinnati Reds.

National League Championship Series

Chicago Cubs vs. San Francisco Giants

This was the first postseason meeting between the Giants and Cubs. The Giants prevailed in five games to return to the World Series for the first time since 1962.

The Giants stole Game 1 on the road as they blew out the Cubs, 11-3. In Game 2, the Cubs jumped out to a big lead early with six runs scored in the bottom of the first, and maintained it as they won 9-5 to even the series headed to San Francisco. In Game 3, the Giants won by one run as Robby Thompson hit a two-run home run in the bottom of the seventh to put the Giants ahead for good. The Giants would take the next two games to secure the pennant.

This was the last time the Giants won the NL pennant until 2002, where they defeated the St. Louis Cardinals in five games. The Cubs would make their next NLCS appearance in 2003, where they blew a 3-1 series lead to the eventual World Series champion Florida Marlins.

The Cubs and Giants would meet again in a Wild Card tiebreaker in 1998, and the 2016 NLDS, and both times the Cubs prevailed.

1989 World Series

Oakland Athletics (AL) vs. San Francisco Giants (NL) 

† Game 3 was originally slated for October 17 at 5:35 pm; however, it was postponed when an earthquake occurred at 5:04 pm.

This was the third all-California matchup in the World Series, and the first to feature both teams from the San Francisco Bay Area. This was also the fourth World Series meeting between the Athletics and Giants (1905, 1911, 1913), dating back to when both teams were in Philadelphia and New York City respectively. The Giants won the former (1905), while the Athletics won the latter two (1911, 1913). The Athletics swept the Giants to win their first World Series title since 1974, and ninth overall. 

Dave Stewart pitched a complete game shutout in Game 1 as the Athletics took Game 1, 5-0. The Giants were unable to solve Mike Moore or the Athletics' relief pitchers as the Athletics took Game 2 by four runs to take a 2-0 series lead headed to the other side of the bay. When the series moved to San Francisco for Game 3, the series was interrupted by the 1989 Loma Prieta earthquake, which occurred before the start of the game, causing major damage to both Oakland and San Francisco. Candlestick Park in San Francisco suffered damage to its upper deck as pieces of concrete fell from the baffle at the top of the stadium and power was knocked out. The game was postponed out of concerns for the safety of everyone in the ballpark as well as the loss of power. Game 3 of the series resumed on October 27, where the Athletics blew out the Giants to go up 3-0 in the series. The Athletics completed a sweep of the Giants the next day with a 9-6 victory in Game 4.

With the win, the Athletics improved their World Series record against the Giants to 3-1. As of 2022, this is the last time the Athletics won the World Series. The Athletics would return to the World Series the following year, but were swept by the Cincinnati Reds in one of the biggest upsets in World Series history. This was the last championship won by a team from Oakland until the NBA's Golden State Warriors won the 2015 NBA Finals over the Cleveland Cavaliers.

This was the last postseason appearance for the Giants until 1997. They would return to the World Series in 2002, but they fell to the Anaheim Angels in seven games.

References

External links
 League Baseball Standings & Expanded Standings - 1989

 
Major League Baseball postseason